Cadoc is the name of a 6th-century saint. It may also refer to:

 Cadoc of Cornwall, an 11th-century prince
 Cadoc (electoral ward), an area of the town of Barry, Vale of Glamorgan, Wales

See also
 St Cadoc's Church (disambiguation)